Metasia straminealis is a moth in the family Crambidae. It was described by George Hampson in 1903. It is found in the Nilgiri Mountains of India.

References

Moths described in 1903
Metasia